The National Association of Blacks in Criminal Justice (NABCJ) is a non-profit, non-partisan association created in 1974 to promote the interests of blacks and other minorities in the justice system. Its members consist of criminal justice professionals as well as those in law enforcement, institutional and community corrections, courts, social services, academia, religious and other community-based groups.

The NABCJ seeks to focus attention on relevant legislation, law enforcement, prosecution, and defense-related needs and practices, with emphasis on the courts, corrections, and the prevention of crime. Among its chief concerns is the general welfare and increased influence of African Americans and people of color as it relates to the administration of justice.

External links
 NABCJ organizational website

Legal organizations based in the United States
African-American professional organizations
1974 establishments in North Carolina
Organizations established in 1974